Genevestigator is an application consisting of a gene expression database and tools to analyse the data. It exists in two versions, biomedical and plant, depending on the species of the underlying microarray and RNAseq data. It was started in January 2004 by scientists from ETH Zurich and is currently developed and commercialized by Nebion AG. 

Researchers and scientists from academia and industry use it to identify, characterize and validate novel drug targets and biomarkers, identify appropriate research models and in general to understand how gene expression changes with different treatments.

Gene expression database
The Genevestigator database comprises transciptomic data from numerous public repositories including GEO, Array Express and renowned cancer research projects as TCGA. Depending on the license agreement, it may also contain data from private gene expression studies. All data are manually curated, quality-controlled and enriched for sample and experiment descriptions derived from corresponding scientific publications.

The number of species from where the samples are derived is constantly increasing. Currently, the biomedical version contains data from human, mouse, rat, monkey, fruitfly and other species and used in biomedical research. Gene expression studies are from various research areas including oncology, immunology, neurology, dermatology and cardiovascular diseases. Samples comprise tissue biopsies and cell lines.

The plant version contains both, widely used model species such as arabidopsis and medicago as well as major corp species such as maize, rice, wheat and soybean.

Gene expression tools
More than 60,000 scientists from academia and industry use Genevestigator for their work in molecular biology, toxicogenomics, biomarker discovery and target validation. The original scientific publication has been cited over 3,500 times.

The analysis tools are divided into three major sets:
 CONDITION SEARCH tools: find conditions such as a tissue, disease, treatment or genetic background that regulate the gene(s) of interest
 GENE SEARCH tools: find genes that are specifically expressed in the condition(s) of interest
 SIMILARITY SEARCH tools: find genes or conditions that show a similar gene expression pattern

See also
Spatiotemporal gene expression

References

 Prasad A, Suresh Kumar S, Dessimoz C, Bleuler S, Laule O, Hruz T, Gruissem W, and P Zimmermann (2013) Global regulatory architecture of human, mouse and rat tissue transcriptomes. BMC Genomics 2013, 14:716.
 Hruz T, Wyss M, Lucas C, Laule O, von Rohr P, Zimmermann P, and S Bleuler (2013) A Multilevel Gamma-Clustering Layout Algorithm for Visualization of Biological Networks. Advances in Bioinformatics, vol. 2013, Article ID 920325, 10 pages, 2013. doi:10.1155/2013/920325.
 Hruz T, Wyss M, Docquier M, Pfaffl MW, Masanetz S, Borghi L, Verbrugge P, Kalaydjieva L, Bleuler S, Laule O, Descombes P, Gruissem W and P Zimmermann (2011) RefGenes: identification of reliable and condition specific reference genes for RT-qPCR data normalization. BMC Genomics 2011, 12:156.
 Hruz T, Laule O, Szabo G, Wessendorp F, Bleuler S, Oertle L, Widmayer P, Gruissem W and P Zimmermann (2008)  Genevestigator V3: a reference expression database for the meta-analysis of transcriptomes.  Advances in Bioinformatics 2008, 420747
 Grennan AK (2006) Genevestigator. Facilitating web-based gene-expression analysis. Plant Physiology 141(4):1164-6
 Laule O, Hirsch-Hoffmann M, Hruz T, Gruissem W, and P Zimmermann (2006) Web-based analysis of the mouse transcriptome using Genevestigator. BMC Bioinformatics 7:311
 Zimmermann P, Hennig L and W Gruissem (2005) Gene expression analysis and network discovery using Genevestigator. Trends in Plant Science 9 10, 407-409
 Zimmermann P, Hirsch-Hoffmann M, Hennig L and W Gruissem (2004) GENEVESTIGATOR: Arabidopsis Microarray Database and Analysis Toolbox. Plant Physiology 136 1, 2621-2632
Zimmermann P, Schildknecht B, Garcia-Hernandez M, Gruissem W, Craigon D, Mukherjee G, May S, Parkinson H, Rhee S, Wagner U and L Hennig (2006) MIAME/Plant - adding value to plant microarray experiments. Plant Methods  2, 1

Genetics
Bioinformatics software